The Pineland, also known as Black Swamp Plantation Summer House, is a historic home located near Garnett, Hampton County, South Carolina. It is an example of late Federal–early Greek Revival residential design with Victorian-era alterations and additions. The house evolved from a summer house for nearby Black Swamp Plantation during the period ca. 1800–1865 to a main residence since 1865. The house is a one-story, double pile, lateral gable, composition shingle-clad roofed residence set upon a high stuccoed brick pier foundation with diagonal wood lattice infill.

It was listed on the National Register of Historic Places in 1999.

References

External links
 sale webpage

Houses on the National Register of Historic Places in South Carolina
Federal architecture in South Carolina
Greek Revival houses in South Carolina
Houses completed in 1865
National Register of Historic Places in Hampton County, South Carolina
Houses in Hampton County, South Carolina